The 2013 Sparkasse ATP Challenger was a professional tennis tournament played in Ortisei, Italy between 4 and 10 November 2013 on indoor hard courts. It was the fourth edition of the tournament which was part of the 2013 ATP Challenger Tour.

Singles main-draw entrants

Seeds

 1 Rankings are as of October 28, 2013.

Other entrants
The following players received wildcards into the singles main draw:
  Matteo Donati
  Farrukh Dustov
  Patrick Prader
  Andreas Seppi

The following players received special exempt into the singles main draw:
  Tim Puetz

The following players received entry from the qualifying draw:
  Richard Becker
  Andrés Artuñedo
  Nikola Mektić
  Alexander Ritschard

Champions

Singles

 Andreas Seppi def.  Simon Greul 7–6(7–4), 6–2

Doubles

 Christopher Kas /  Tim Puetz def.  Benjamin Becker /  Daniele Bracciali 6–2, 7–5

External links
Official Website

Internazionali Tennis Val Gardena Sudtirol
Internazionali Tennis Val Gardena Südtirol
2013 in Italian tennis